Anders Frøen, professionally known as Mood Melodies, is a Norwegian record producer and songwriter. He has produced and written songs for Zedd, Jessie J, Alan Walker, Brandy and Karmin.

Career
Mood Melodies got his big international break when Alan Walker's "Faded" became an international hit in 2016, with more than 3 billion YouTube views to date. He signed to Stargate and Sony/ATV's joint venture publishing company Stellar Songs in 2016.

Alan Walker controversy

In May 2017, Future Music Magazine uploaded a video in which showcases how Alan Walker's song Alone was produced. However, throughout the video, Mood Melodies was deeply involved which was met with overwhelmingly negative responses from fans, particularly those of Walker. This allegedly lead him to step down from co-producing with Walker, leading to many of his later songs like "On My Way" and "Alone, pt. II" receiving mixed-to-negative reviews from fans, whom most of them favor Walker's signature electro house style. Despite this, Mood Melodies returned to co-production with Walker on his song "Hello World", which was released in March 2022.

Songwriting and production credits

References

External links
 
 Official website

Norwegian record producers
Norwegian songwriters
1987 births
Living people